The Center for Infectious Disease Research and Policy (CIDRAP) is a center within the University of Minnesota that focuses on addressing public health preparedness and emerging infectious disease response. It was founded in 2001 by Dr. Michael Osterholm, in order to "prevent illness and death from infectious diseases through epidemiological research and rapid translation of scientific information into real-world practical applications and solutions".

It is not part of the Center for Disease Control or National Institute of Health.

History 
Michael Osterholm founded Center for Infectious Disease Research and Policy (CIDRAP) in 2001.

In 2019, the CIDR (Center for Infectious Disease Research in Seattle) was absorbed by the Seattle Children's Research Institute but the CIDRAP is not the same organization.

Primary activities

News publishing

CIDRAP's news publishing division writes news stories and maintains information on influenza, bioterrorism, and new hot topics.

The CIDRAP news team, through the CIDRAP web site, provides daily news updates on emerging infectious diseases, such as pandemic influenza, bioterrorism, food safety, avian influenza, and emerging topics. Along with news articles, the site provides overviews on various infectious disease topics, as well as lists of recent selected literature for each topic. CIDRAP's daily news service has 20,000 current newsletter subscribers and over 36,000 Twitter followers.

Influenza Vaccines Roadmap 
CIDRAP is leading an international collaborative effort to develop an influenza vaccines R&D roadmap (IVR), aimed at accelerating progress toward universal or broadly protective influenza vaccines, one of the most critical global public-health priorities. The IVR serves as a valuable tool to advance the development of novel vaccines that improve the breadth and durability of protection from influenza infection and severe disease. It encompasses incremental improvements in strain-specific seasonal vaccines, as well as transformational changes in vaccine technology designed to induce broad, durable protection against seasonal and pandemic influenza viruses.

Antimicrobial Stewardship Program 
Antimicrobial resistance is a critical global public health issue, and antimicrobial stewardship strategies are key to curtailing the problem. CIDRAP's Antimicrobial Stewardship Project provides current, accurate, and comprehensive information on the topic and works to build an online community to address leading issues.

Novel Coronavirus (COVID-19) Resource Center 
CIDRAP is tracking and analyzing the rapidly evolving novel coronavirus (COVID-19) pandemic. The CIDRAP COVID-19 Resource Center provides a deep well of information for public health experts, business preparedness leaders, government officials, and the public.

Resilient Drug Supply Project 
The Resilient Drug Supply Project focuses on the supply chains and global disruptions for the most critical drugs for life-saving and life-sustaining treatment. Outcomes of this research will improve the healthcare supply system's ability to maintain a steady and adequate supply of critical medicines and supplies worldwide.

CIDRAP Leadership Forum 
Membership in the CIDRAP Leadership Forum (CLF) connects decisionmakers to intelligence they can trust when they need it most. The CLF is a high-value, highly responsive service offered by CIDRAP  that ensures businesses and organizations have rapid access to critical intelligence on emerging infectious disease threats and public health issues. Members say CLF provides insight and analysis they cannot find easily elsewhere.

CLF members connect with Michael T. Osterholm, an international authority on emerging infectious diseases, and  the comprehensive team of CIDRAP experts through special communications, conference calls, webinars, and special CLF events.

Past Initiatives

Ebola Vaccine Team B 
Wellcome Trust and CIDRAP launched the Ebola vaccine Team B initiative in November 2014 to assist international efforts to develop in record time safe and effective vaccines against Ebola virus disease. The project includes 25 distinguished leaders in public health, medicine, bioethics, pharmaceutical manufacturing, and humanitarian relief. The experts provide a fresh perspective (a Team B analysis) of issues being addressed by international collaborators in the areas of funding, research, development, vaccine efficacy and effectiveness determination, licensure, manufacturing, and vaccination strategy (distribution and administration). To date, Team B has published its findings in the following reports:

"Completing the Development of Ebola Vaccines: Current Status, Remaining Challenges, and Recommendations"
"Plotting the Course of Ebola Vaccines: Challenges and Unanswered Questions"
"Recommendations for Accelerating Development of Ebola Vaccines: Report and Analysis"
"Fast-Track Development of Ebola Vaccines: Principles and Target Product Criteria"

BioWatch
CIDRAP has served as a partner in the federal BioWatch air-monitoring program. This program is responsible for the constant monitoring for potential bioterrorism-related agents in cities throughout the United States. Through its contract with the Department of Homeland Security, CIDRAP provides support for the development of national outdoor and indoor guidance documents, a national epidemiology communications network, and a suite of related program and reference documents.

Minnesota Center of Excellence for Influenza Research and Surveillance (MCEIRS)
The Minnesota Center of Excellence for Influenza Research and Surveillance (MCEIRS), established by the National Institutes of Health (NIH) and CIDRAP in April 2007, was one of six NIH-supported centers in the United States. The activities of the center, including research and surveillance both domestically and abroad, were focused on the detection, epidemiology, and transmission of avian influenza (AI) viruses with pandemic potential. The primary goal of MCEIRS was to enhance the understanding of how AI viruses evolve, adapt, and spread among animal and human populations. The center closed in April 2014.

Influenza training
The Center of Excellence for Influenza Research and Surveillance has developed an online training portal that provides e-learning modules on topics related to avian influenza and influenza in general.

CIDRAP Comprehensive Influenza Vaccine Initiative (CCIVI)
In December 2009 a grant by the Alfred P. Sloan Foundation started the CIDRAP Comprehensive Influenza Vaccine Initiative. The primary goal of CCIVI was to review all aspects of 2009-2010 H1N1 influenza vaccine preparedness and response and to review the scientific and programmatic basis for the current seasonal influenza vaccine efforts. The final report, published October 15, 2012, is a review of more than 12,000 peer-reviewed publications, documents, transcripts and notes dating back to 1936 and interviews and follow up with 88 experts in influenza vaccine research, development, and use.

Public Health Practices (PHP)

Public Health Practices (PHP) was a curated compendium of tools, strategies, and downloadables created by US health agencies and partners to prepare for and respond to the health consequences of disasters and emergencies. The project was ended in December 2014.

Practitioners can still search the one-stop shop of real-world resources by hazard, strategy, partners, geography, groups being served, agency, tool, language, and key word. PHP encourages peer-to-peer exchange of practices by accepting submissions to the site, showcasing examples in theme-based email newsletters, and hosting social media channels for practitioners.

Public Health Practices features:

 More than 400 practices addressing a wide range of hazards
 Successful coalitions and details about what made them possible
 Stories on how projects were created
 Communication materials in 40 languages to download or adapt
 A search tool that allows users to apply filters to narrow results as needed
 A simple submissions process to encourage practitioners to share their work
 Peer-to-peer information exchange via social media

Notes

External links

Comprehensive Influenza Vaccine Initiative (CCIVI)
Public Health Practices
Minnesota Center of Excellence for Influenza Research & Surveillance (MCEIRS)

Public health organizations
University of Minnesota